The 1985 King Cup was the 27th season of the knockout competition since its establishment in 1956. Al-Hilal were the defending champions but they were eliminated by eventual champions Al-Ettifaq in the final. This was the first edition of the competition to have 16 teams participate instead of 32.

Al-Ettifaq won their 2nd title after defeating Al-Hilal 1–0 in the final.

Bracket

Note:     H: Home team,   A: Away team  

Source: Al Jazirah

Round of 16
The matches of the Round of 16 were played on 4 and 5 February 1985.

Quarter-finals
The Quarter-final matches were held on 11 and 12 February 1985.

Semi-finals
The four winners of the quarter-finals progressed to the semi-finals. The semi-finals were played on 18 February 1985. All times are local, AST (UTC+3).

Final
The final was played between Al-Hilal and Al-Ettifaq in the Youth Welfare Stadium in Al-Malaz, Riyadh. Al-Hilal were appearing in their 10th final while Al-Ettifaq were making their 5th appearance in the final.

Top goalscorers

References

1985
Saudi Arabia
Cup